Jon Riki Karamatsu was a Democratic member of the Hawaii House of Representatives, representing the state's 41st district from 2002 to 2011.

On October 16, 2007, at about 1:15 a.m., Karamatsu lost control of his vehicle and struck a concrete pillar while travelling west-bound on the Moanalua Freeway. Karamatsu failed a police sobriety test and was found to have a blood alcohol content of .171 - more than twice the legal limit of .08. Karamatsu had previously been cited by law enforcement for speeding violations.

As a result of the October 2007 incident, Karamatsu stepped down from his position as Vice Speaker of the Hawaii House of Representatives.

In November 2008, it was announced that Karamatsu will serve as Chair of the House Judiciary Committee.

In 2010, instead of running for re-election in his house seat, Karamatsu decided to run for lieutenant governor. However, in the primary election, he came in at sixth place.

References

External links
Hawaii House of Representatives - Jon Karamatsu official government website
Project Vote Smart - Representative Jon Karamatsu (HI) profile
Follow the Money - Jon Karamatsu
2006 2004 2002 campaign contributions

Members of the Hawaii House of Representatives
1974 births
Living people
Hawaii politicians of Japanese descent
People from Honolulu